Fabienne Deprez (born 8 February 1992) is a German badminton player. She won the gold medal at the European Junior Championships in the team event in 2011, a silver in the mixed doubles in 2009, also two bronzes in the team and girls' singles in 2009 and 2011 respectively. Deprez was part of the national team that won the 2012 European Women's Team Championships. She played for the FC Langenfeld, and emerge as the women's singles champion at the 2013 German National Championships.

Achievements

European Junior Championships 
Girls' singles

Mixed doubles

BWF International Challenge/Series (1 title, 3 runners-up) 
Women's singles

  BWF International Challenge tournament
  BWF International Series tournament
  BWF Future Series tournament

References

External links 
 
 
 
 
 

1992 births
Living people
People from Mettmann (district)
Sportspeople from Düsseldorf (region)
German female badminton players
Badminton players at the 2010 Summer Youth Olympics
Badminton players at the 2015 European Games
European Games competitors for Germany